Saint Dogmael (or Docmael, Dogfael, Dogmeel, Dogwel, Toel) was a 6th-century Welsh monk and preacher who is considered a saint. His feast day is 14 June.

Life

Dogmael (or Dogfael, Dogwel) was of the house of Cunedda, descended from the kings of Wales, and was the son of Ithel ap Ceredig ab Cunedda Wledig. His grandmother was Saint Meleri, daughter of Saint Brychan.
Dogmael became a monk, and seems to have concentrated his preaching in Pembrokeshire, where there are a number of churches dedicated to him.

Legacy

The following of Dogfael is reflected in a number of churches in what is now north Pembrokeshire. 
Based on the locations of his churches, Dogmael's cult was centered to the south of the River Teifi in the Dyfed communities of Cemais and Pebidiog.

St Dogmael's Abbey, now ruined, stands on a hillside above the Teifi. It was founded in 1120 by Robert fitz Martin and his wife Maud Peveril.
It contains the traditional site of St Dogmael's grave.

The village of St Dogmaels  is on the south side of the Teifi, facing Cardigan; St Dogmaels is named in Welsh Llandudoch.
Other churches include Capel Degwel nearby, St Dogwell's near Fishguard and the Church of St Dogfael, Meline.
Llanddogwel (Llanddygfael) in Anglesey is also dedicated to the saint.

Butler's account

The hagiographer Alban Butler wrote in his Lives of the Primitive Fathers, Martyrs, and Other Principal Saints, under June 14,

Notes

Sources

 

 

Children of Brychan
6th-century deaths